"2U" is a song by French DJ and record producer David Guetta, featuring vocals from Canadian singer Justin Bieber. The song has EDM elements. It was written by Justin Bieber, Poo Bear, Cesqeaux and its producer Guetta and Giorgio Tuinfort. It was released on 9 June 2017 by What a Music, as the lead single from Guetta's seventh studio album, 7 (2018).

Background
"2U" is the third collaborative single for Bieber in 2017 following "I'm the One" and "Despacito", both of which topped the US Billboard Hot 100 and other national charts.

A thirteen-second teaser was revealed by Victoria's Secret's models Elsa Hosk, Jasmine Tookes, Romee Strijd and Sara Sampaio. The cover art was revealed by Guetta on 8 June 2017. Guetta told MTV that the song was "just very romantic".

Music video
Guetta announced that there would be two music videos for the single; the Victoria's Secret version and another version which he calls "not branded". The first version features Victoria's Secret models Sara Sampaio, Romee Strijd, Elsa Hosk, Jasmine Tookes, Stella Maxwell and Martha Hunt lip-syncing the song while on-set of a photo shoot for the lingerie brand. The second music video was released on 29 September 2017 on YouTube.

Track listing
Digital download
"2U" – 3:15

Digital download – Robin Schulz remix
"2U" (Robin Schulz remix) – 5:21

Digital download – GLOWINTHEDARK remix
"2U" (GLOWINTHEDARK remix) – 3:30

Digital download – MORTEN remix
"2U" (MORTEN remix) – 3:49

Digital download – Afrojack remix
"2U" (Afrojack remix) – 4:24

Digital download – R3hab remix
"2U" (R3hab remix) – 2:36

Digital download – FRNDS remix
"2U" (FRNDS remix) – 3:09

Credits and personnel
Credits adapted from Tidal.

 David Guetta – songwriting, producer
 Justin Bieber – songwriting
 Jason "Poo Bear" Boyd – songwriting, vocal production
 Giorgio Tuinfort – songwriting, producer, pianist
 Daniel "Cesqeaux" Tuparia – additional producer and programming
 Daddy's Groove – mastering engineer, mixer
 Henry Sarmiento III – engineer
 Chris "TEK" O'Ryan – vocoder, recorder
 The Pianoman – talk box
 Monsieur Georges – talk box
 Josh Gudwin – recorder

Charts

Weekly charts

Year-end charts

Certifications

Release history

References

External links
 

2017 singles
2017 songs
Justin Bieber songs
David Guetta songs
Songs written by Poo Bear
Songs written by Giorgio Tuinfort
Songs written by David Guetta
Songs written by Justin Bieber
Song recordings produced by David Guetta